Chumphon Airport ,,  is an airport in Tambon Chum Kho, Pathio District, Chumphon, Thailand. The airport is 35 kilometres north of Chumphon.

Airlines and destinations

Overview
In 2008 the airport reopened after nine years of closure. The airport now serves as a gateway to the islands of the Gulf of Thailand.

Plans
Airports of Thailand PCL (AOT) is budgeting 220 billion baht in 2018 for the creation of two new airports and the expansion of four existing airports owned by the Department of Airports. Chumphon Airport is one of the four slated for expansion and AOT management. AOT intends to build Chiang Mai 2 in Lamphun Province and Phuket Airport 2 in Phang Nga Province. The three other existing airports to be managed by AOT are Tak Airport, Sakon Nakhon Airport, and Udon Thani International Airport.

References

External links
World Aero Data Chumphon Airport
Thai Flying Club
Chumphon Airport Information 
Airport Fact Sheet

Airports in Thailand
Chumphon province
Airports established in 1998